Cyrtosia is the scientific name of two genera of organisms and may refer to:

Cyrtosia (fly), a genus of insects in the family Mythicomyiidae
Cyrtosia (plant), a genus of plants in the family Orchidaceae
 Cyrtosia (Packard, 1864), a synonym for Packardia, a genus of moths in the family Limacodidae